Edward Oluoch Odumbe (born 19 May 1965 in Kendu Bay, Kenya) is a former Kenyan cricketer. He played eight One Day Internationals for Kenya.

References

External links
 

1965 births
Living people
Kenyan cricketers
Kenya One Day International cricketers
Kenyan cricket coaches